Carmen Salcedo District is one of twenty-one districts of the Lucanas Province in Peru.

Geography 
Other mountains are listed below:

Ethnic groups 
The people in the district are mainly indigenous citizens of Quechua descent. Quechua is the language which the majority of the population (56.46%) learnt to speak in childhood, 43.24% of the residents started speaking using the Spanish language (2007 Peru Census).

See also 
 Kanichi
 Nina Kiru
 Quriwayrachina
 Waman Pirqa

References